Trinity Methodist Episcopal Church (also known as Tucker Baptist Church) was a historic church on McCallie Avenue in Chattanooga, Tennessee.

It was built in 1899. At one time it housed Tucker Missionary Baptist Church. It was added to the National Register of Historic Places in 1980.  The building suffered a catastrophic collapse on the morning of May 10, 2011. The building had most recently belonged to The Living Word Ministries, but had been disused for some time. No one was injured in the collapse.

References

Methodist churches in Tennessee
Former churches in Tennessee
Churches on the National Register of Historic Places in Tennessee
Churches completed in 1899
19th-century Methodist church buildings in the United States
Churches in Chattanooga, Tennessee
National Register of Historic Places in Chattanooga, Tennessee